Keaton Beach is a Gulf coast community in the southern part of Taylor County, Florida, United States. Keaton Beach is located at 29.8244° N, 83.5949° W. Keaton Beach is 22.5 miles south of the county seat of Perry.

History
According to local historians, Keaton Beach was named for Abb and Sam Keaton, two brothers who apparently first settled in the area and who are thought to be its original owners. It is believed that their family originally owned cotton farms in the area, however, their primary source of income gradually shifted as mullet fishing became one of the thriving industries in Taylor County. In the early 1900s, mullet were caught off the Florida coast and residents of south Georgia and north Florida would come to Keaton Beach to buy the fish, which were salted down for use during the winter. Thus mullet became a staple food of the regional diet. The real commercialization of the beach came when Captain W. Alston "Cap'n" Brown, who owned the turpentine works at Blue Springs Creek, became involved with the area in the early 1920s. The Keaton Brothers were said to have worked with Brown, and he named the Beach in honor of them. Keaton Beach has had several primary owners throughout the years, however it has currently developed into a residential area with homes that are owned by individual families.

Early on the community consisted of two houses, a pavilion, a sawmill, a church, a commissary and several workers' houses along Blue Creek Spring. The pavilion was constructed by Captain Brown in the early 1900s, and was passed on to Walter Howard at a later date. By day it was used by Mr. Howard and his partner, Mr. Kelly, as a place to repair their mullet nets. However the pavilion soon became known as a non-commercial place for family and friends to meet in the evenings. One area resident was quoted in a local publication as having said, "The pavilion was a fun place to square dance at night." Later the pavilion was used primarily as a fish camp by day and as a dance hall and restaurant by night.

The Stephens family purchased the property of Keaton Beach from Clarence Kelly of Madison County, Florida in 1946. In the 1940s the Stephens family frequently visited Keaton Beach as a weekend getaway. However, the Keaton Beach, Inc. company eventually bought a parcel of 337 acres of Taylor County beaches that included the Keaton Beach area from Mr. and Mrs. Stephens. The Keaton Beach restaurant, pavilion and eight cottages were included in the deal. The land area included the frontage on the Gulf as well as Blue Creek.

The Storm of the Century

Keaton and the surrounding beaches were devastated on March 13, 1993 when the "No Name Storm" (also known as "The Storm of the Century") battered the beach without warning early Saturday morning. Several residents and visitors of neighboring Dekle Beach lost their lives that day.

Current development
Keaton Beach is home to Taylor County's primary public beach area, which includes sandy beaches, a local pier and children's play area known as Hodges Park. Keaton is also home to the county's primary public boat ramp, which is owned and maintained by Taylor County and the Board of County Commissioners. Keaton Beach is also well known for being a premier summer scalloping destination as well as providing an abundance of fishing opportunities for Florida anglers.

References

Geography of Taylor County, Florida
Gulf Coast of the United States